The 2021–22 Rice Owls men's basketball team represented Rice University during the 2021–22 NCAA Division I men's basketball season. The team was led by fifth-year head coach Scott Pera, and played their home games at Tudor Fieldhouse in Houston, Texas as members of Conference USA.

Previous season
The Owls finished the 2020–21 season 15–13, 6–10 in C-USA play to finish in sixth place in West Division. They defeated Southern Miss in first round and Marshall in the second before losing to UAB in the quarterfinals.

Offseason

Departures

Incoming transfers

2021 recruiting class

2022 recruiting class

Roster

Schedule and results

|-
!colspan=12 style=| Exhibition

|-
!colspan=12 style=| Regular season

|-
!colspan=12 style=| Conference USA tournament

|-
!colspan=9 style=| College Basketball Invitational

Source

See also
 2021–22 Rice Owls women's basketball team

References

Rice Owls men's basketball seasons
Rice
Rice
Rice men's basketball
Rice men's basketball